Electoral college elections were held in the Caribbean Netherlands on 20 March 2019 to elect the members of the electoral colleges for the Senate. The elections were held on the same day as the island council elections in the Caribbean Netherlands, and the provincial and water board elections in the European Netherlands. These elections indirectly determine the composition of the Senate, since the members of the electoral colleges, alongside the States-Provincial elected in the European Netherlands on the same day, will elect the Senate's 75 members in the Senate election on 27 May, two months after the electoral college elections.

Results

Bonaire

Saba

Sint Eustatius

See also 
 2019 Dutch Senate election

References 

2019 elections in the Caribbean
Electoral college
March 2019 events in North America
2019 in Bonaire
Elections in Bonaire
Elections in Saba (island)
Elections in Sint Eustatius